microLED, also known as micro-LED, mLED or µLED is an emerging flat-panel display technology consisting of arrays of microscopic LEDs forming the individual pixel elements. The first high-resolution and video-capable InGaN microLED microdisplay in VGA format was realized in 2009 by Hongxing Jiang and Jingyu Lin and their colleagues at Texas Tech University and III-N Technology, Inc. via active driving of microLED array by a complementary metal-oxide semiconductor (CMOS) IC. Compared to widespread LCD technology, microLED displays offer better contrast, response times, and energy efficiency.

MicroLED offers greatly reduced energy requirements when compared to conventional LCD displays while also offering pixel-level light control and a high contrast ratio. The inorganic nature of microLEDs gives them a longer lifetime advantage over OLEDs and allows them to display brighter images with minimal risk of screen burn-in. The sub-nanosecond response time of µLED has a huge advantage over other display technologies for 3D/AR/VR displays since these devices need more images, more pixels per image, more frames per second and fast response.

, microLED displays have not been mass-produced, although Sony, Samsung, and Konka sell microLED video walls. LG, Tianma, PlayNitride, TCL/CSoT, Jasper Display, Jade Bird Display, Plessey Semiconductors Ltd, and Ostendo Technologies, Inc. have demonstrated prototypes. Sony already sells microLED displays as a replacement for conventional cinema screens. BOE, Epistar, and Leyard have plans for microLED mass production. MicroLED can be made flexible and transparent, just like OLEDs.

Research
Inorganic semiconductor microLED (µLED) technology was first invented in 2000 by the research group of Hongxing Jiang and Jingyu Lin of Texas Tech University while they were at Kansas State University. Following their first report of electrical injection microLEDs based on indium gallium nitride (InGaN) semiconductors, several groups have quickly engaged in pursuing this concept. Many related potential applications have been identified. Various on-chip connection schemes of microLED pixel arrays have been employed by AC LED Lighting, LLC (a company funded by Hongxing Jiang and Jingyu Lin) allowing for the development of single-chip high voltage DC/AC-LEDs to address the compatibility issue between the high voltage electrical infrastructure and low voltage operation nature of LEDs and high brightness self-emissive microdisplays.

The microLED array has also been explored as a light source for optogenetics applications and for visible light communications.

Early InGaN based microLED arrays and microdisplays were primarily passively driven. The first actively driven video-capable self-emissive InGaN microLED microdisplay in VGA format ( pixels, each 12µm in size with 15µm between them) possessing low voltage requirements was patented and realized in 2009 by  Hongxing Jiang and Jingyu Lin and their colleagues at III-N Technology, Inc. (a company funded by Hongxing Jiang and Jingyu Lin) and Texas Tech University, via heterogeneous integration between microLED array and CMOS integrated circuit (IC) and the work was also published in the following years.

The first microLED products were demonstrated by Sony in 2012. These displays, however, were very expensive.

There are several methods to manufacture microLED displays. The flip-chip method manufactures the LED on a conventional sapphire substrate, while the transistor array and solder bumps are deposited on silicon wafers using conventional manufacturing and metallization processes. Mass transfer is used to pick and place several thousand LEDs from one wafer to another at the same time, and the LEDs are bonded to the silicon substrate using reflow ovens. The flip-chip method is used for micro displays used on virtual reality headsets. The drawbacks include cost, limited pixel size, limited placement accuracy, and the need for cooling to prevent the display from warping and breaking due to thermal mismatch between the LEDs and the silicon. Also, current microLED displays are less efficient than comparable OLED displays. Another microLED manufacturing method involves bonding the LEDs to an IC layer on a silicon substrate and then removing the LED bonding material using conventional semiconductor manufacturing techniques. The current bottleneck in the manufacturing process is the need to individually test every LED and replace faulty ones using an excimer laser lift-off apparatus, which uses a laser to weaken the bond between the LED and its substrate. Faulty LED replacement must be performed using high accuracy pick-and-place machines and the test and repair process takes several hours. The mass transfer process alone can take 18 days, for a smartphone screen with a glass substrate. Special LED manufacturing techniques can be used to increase yield and reduce the amount of faulty LEDs that need to be replaced. Each LED can be as small as 5µm across. LED epitaxy techniques need to be improved to increase LED yields.

Excimer lasers are used for several steps: laser lift-off to separate LEDs from their sapphire substrate and to remove faulty LEDs, for manufacturing the LTPS-TFT backplane, and for laser cutting of the finished LEDs. Special mass transfer techniques using elastomer stamps are also being researched. Other companies are exploring the possibility of packaging 3 LEDs: one red, one green and one blue LED into a single package to reduce mass transfer costs.

Quantum dots are being researched as a way to shrink the size of microLED pixels, while other companies are exploring the use of phosphors and quantum dots to eliminate the need for different-colored LEDs. Sensors can be embedded in microLED displays.

Over 130 companies are involved in microLED research and development. MicroLED light panels are also being made, and are an alternative to conventional OLED and LED light panels.

Digital pulse-width modulation is well-suited to driving microLED displays. MicroLEDs experience a color shift as the current magnitude changes. Analog schemes change current to change brightness. With a digital pulse, only one current value is used for the on state. Thus, there is no color shift that occurs as brightness changes.

Current microLED display offerings by Samsung and Sony consist of "cabinets" that can be tiled to create a large display of any size, with the display's resolution increasing with size. They also contain mechanisms to protect the display against water and dust.

Commercialization
microLEDs have innate potential performance advantages over LCD displays, including higher brightness, lower latency, higher contrast ratio, greater color saturation, intrinsic self-illumination, and better efficiency. As of 2016, technological and production barriers have prevented commercialization.

As of 2016, a number of different technologies were under active research for the assembling of individual LED pixels on a substrate. These include chip bonding of microLED chips onto a substrate (considered to have potential for large displays), wafer production methods using etching to produce an LED array followed by bonding to an IC, and wafer production methods using an intermediate temporary thin film to transfer the LED array to a substrate.

Glo and Jasper Display Corporation demonstrated the world's first RGB microLED microdisplay, measuring  diagonally, at SID Display Week 2017. Glo transferred their microLEDs to the Jasper Display backplane.

Sony launched a  "Crystal LED Display" in 2012 with  resolution, as a demonstration product. Sony announced its CLEDIS (Crystal LED Integrated Structure) brand which used surface mounted LEDs for large display production. On 12 September 2019, Sony announced Crystal LED availability to consumers ranging from 1080p  to 16K  displays.

Samsung demonstrated a  microLED display called The Wall at CES 2018. In July 2018, Samsung announced plans on bringing a 4K microLED TV to consumer market in 2019. At CES 2019, Samsung demonstrated a  4K microLED display and  6K microLED display. On October 4, 2019, Samsung announced that The Wall Luxury microLED display shipments had begun.

In March 2018, Bloomberg reported Apple to have about 300 engineers devoted to in-house development of microLED screens. At IFA 2018 in August, LG Display demonstrated a  microLED display.

At SID's Display Week 2019 in May, Tianma and PlayNitride demonstrated their co-developed  microLED display with over 60% transparency. China Star Optoelectronics Technology (CSoT) demonstrated a  transparent microLED display with around 45% transparency, also co-developed with PlayNitride. Plessey Semiconductors Ltd demonstrated a monolithic monochrome blue GaN-on-silicon wafer bonded to a Jasper Display CMOS backplane  active-matrix microLED display with an 8μm pixel pitch.

At SID's Display Week 2019 in May, Jade Bird Display demonstrated their 720p and 1080p microLED microdisplays with 5μm and 2.5μm pitch respectively, achieving luminance in the millions of candelas per square metre. In 2021, Jade Bird Display and Vuzix have entered a Joint manufacturing agreement for making microLED based projectors for smart glasses and augmented reality glasses 

At Touch Taiwan 2019 on September 4, 2019, AU Optronics demonstrated a  microLED display and indicated that microLED was 12 years from mass commercialization. At IFA 2019 on September 13, 2019, TCL Corporation demonstrated their Cinema Wall featuring a 4K  microLED display with maximum brightness of 1,500cd/m and  contrast ratio produced by their subsidiary China Star Optoelectronics Technology (CSoT).

According to a report by Bloomberg Apple is working on its own in-house design of MicroLED displays which will end Apple’s dependencies on Samsung, LG and other display manufacturers.
Apple over the last decade has been looking to move more of the components away from third-party suppliers into their own in-house designs. This is going to continue now with MicroLED. The company is going to do their own starting at the end of next year or in 2025 starting with the Apple watches.

See also
 OLED
 AMOLED
 Mini LED

References

External links
"The Long View With John Doerr", John Doerr of KPC&B describes the microLED concept, starts around the 5 minute mark.
Crystal LED - Sony
LED screens are significantly different from microLED

Display technology
Light-emitting diodes